The Baghdad governorate election of 2009 was held on 31 January 2009 alongside elections for all other governorates outside Iraqi Kurdistan and Kirkuk.

Background 

Two seats in Baghdad are reserved for minority religions: one for Christians and one for Sabians. Over 3,000 candidates contested the 57 seats.

Campaign 

A candidate for the Iraqi Islamic Party was killed outside his home in the al-Ameriya district.

Results 
Sunni Arab residents of the Fadel district complained that they felt it was dangerous registering to vote because the office was in a neighbouring area that was Shiite dominated and they had to pass through two checkpoints. Many voters in that district were reported to have been turned away as they were not registered and turnout was less than 30%.

The Iraqi National List of former Prime Minister Ayad Allawi was said to have won most support in Fadel along with the Iraqi Communist Party. A local Sahwa official and former 1920 Revolution Brigade member said he knew former al-Qaeda in Iraq fighters who had voted for the INL.

In March, the State of Law Coalition said it would ally with the Iraqi National Dialogue Front.

See also 

 Assyrian politics in Iraq#Iraqi Governorate Elections 2009

References 

2009 Iraqi governorate elections
Baghdad Governorate